Iron Flowers is the first full length release by Long Beach, California band, Repeater.  This eight-song album was recorded at Bomb Shelter Studios in Los Angeles, California. It was recorded in 3 days and produced by Chris Fudurich.

Track listing 
 "A Second Home"
 "Missing"
 "Carved in Shadow"
 "The Gifted and the Damned"
 "Killing Without Question "
 "The Time Apart"
 "No Single Lover"
 "Last Conscience"

Personnel
Steve Krolikowski (vocals and guitar)
Rob Wallace (keyboards)
Victor Cuevas (bass)
Nate Wainscott (guitar)
Matt Hanief (drums)

Technical personnel
Produced, engineered and mixed By Chris Fudurich

References

External links 
 Repeater, office website
Repeater, on Facebook
Repeater, on MySpace

2008 albums
Repeater (band) albums